MV Morning Glory, formerly Gulf Glory, Bandar Ayu, and Pergiwati, is a 1993-built crude oil tanker. Considered a stateless vessel with stolen cargo, the tanker was seized by United States Special Operations Forces southeast of Cyprus in the eastern Mediterranean on March 16, 2014. The intervention occurred upon the request of the Libyan and Cypriot governments.

As Gulf Glory the vessel had previously sailed under Liberian registry. In 2011, the Morning Glory was repaired at the CIC Changxing Shipyard, China.

March 2014 event
Apparently the tanker had been ordered to Libyan waters off the port of Sidra, Libya where it was seized by rebel gunmen. Flying the flag of North Korea the vessel then entered the port of Sidra in early March 2014. North Korea, however, disavowed the ship once it learned that it was under rebel control. Sidra is under control of an eastern Libyan militia group that under the leadership of Ibrahim Jathran defies the central government and aims for greater autonomy.  At Sidra the tanker was loaded with 234,000 barrels of state-owned crude oil that had been seized by the rebels.

The Libyan government intended to prevent the ship from leaving the port on March 11, but failed to establish an effective blockade. As a result, the Ali Zeidan government collapsed. Fearing for his safety Zeidan then fled the country. The rebels had planned to sell the oil bypassing the Libyan government, however the intervention on sea blocked this attempt.

References

1993 ships
Captured ships
Maritime incidents in 2014
Oil tankers
Ships of Libya